Samiel may refer to:
 Simoom, a strong, dry, dust-laden wind
 Samael, an archangel in Talmudic and post-Talmudic lore
 Samiel, a fictional character in the opera Der Freischütz